The Hardee hat, also known as the Model 1858 Dress Hat and sometimes nicknamed the "Jeff Davis", was the regulation dress hat for enlisted men in the Union Army during the American Civil War. The Hardee hat was also worn by Confederate soldiers.  However, most soldiers found the black felt hat to be too hot and heavy and shunned its use, preferring a forage cap or slouch hat. However, the unadorned, plain and often field-modified Hardee hat was worn by Union troops, especially in the Western theater. The hardee hat was most famously worn, and easily identified, as the hat worn by the Union Army's Iron Brigade, which became their trademark and were popularly known, by the nickname, "The Black Hats". 

The hat was named after William J. Hardee, a career officer in the U.S. Army from 1838 until resigning his commission on January 31, 1861. Hardee was Commandant of Cadets at West Point from 1856 to 1860. He was lieutenant colonel of the 1st U.S. Cavalry until just before the war. In 1855, he published Rifle and Light Infantry Tactics for the Exercise and Manoeuvres of Troops When Acting as Light Infantry or Riflemen, popularly known as Hardee's Tactics, which became the best-known drill manual of both sides of the Civil War. He joined the Confederate States Army in March 1861 and eventually became a lieutenant general and corps commander.

U.S. Army regulations specified that the hat should be adorned with a brass hat device and a wool hat cord denoting the branch of service of the wearer: sky blue for infantry, scarlet for artillery, and gold for cavalry. The brim was to be pinned up on the right side for cavalrymen and artillerymen, and on the left for infantry soldiers.

References

External links
Hardee hat as worn by Confederate soldiers

Civil War military equipment of the United States
Hats
United States military uniforms
Union Army
Iron Brigade